Enemies (Russian: Vragi) is a 1953 Soviet drama film directed by Tamara Rodionova and starring Vasili Sofronov, Elena Granovskaya and Nikolai Korn. It is based on the 1906 play of the same name by Maxim Gorky.

A made-for-TV remake was released in 1974.

Cast
 Vasili Sofronov as Zakhar Bardin 
 Elena Granovskaya 
 Nikolai Korn 
 Valentina Kibardina 
 Nina Olkhina 
 Ivan Yefremov 
 Vladislav Strzhelchik
 Aleksandr Larikov

References

Bibliography 
 Goble, Alan. The Complete Index to Literary Sources in Film. Walter de Gruyter, 1999.

External links 
 

1953 films
1953 drama films
Soviet drama films
1950s Russian-language films
Films based on works by Maxim Gorky
Soviet black-and-white films